Ezio Corlaita (25 October 1889 – 20 September 1967) was an Italian professional racing cyclist. He notably won the 1915 Milan–San Remo and three stages of the Giro d'Italia, in 1911 and 1919. He also won the 1914 Giro dell'Emilia and the 1913 Milano–Modena.

Major results

1908
 10th Milano–Modena
1910
 4th Overall Giro d'Italia
1911
 5th Overall Giro d'Italia
1st Stages 9 & 12
 5th Giro dell'Emilia
 6th Giro di Romagna
1912
 4th Milan–San Remo
1913
 1st Milano–Modena
 2nd Giro dell'Emilia
 2nd Giro di Campania
 3rd Milan–San Remo
 3rd Giro di Romagna
 3rd Milano–Torino
1914
 1st Giro dell'Emilia
1915
 1st Milan–San Remo
 4th Milano–Torino
1917
 7th Milan–San Remo
1918
 4th Milan–San Remo
 8th Giro dell'Emilia
1919
 2nd Giro dell'Emilia
 7th Overall Giro d'Italia
1st Stage 4
 7th Gran Piemonte
1921
 8th Milano–Modena

References

External links

1889 births
1967 deaths
20th-century Italian people
Italian Giro d'Italia stage winners
Italian male cyclists
Cyclists from Bologna